Gampen Pass; (1,518 m) is a high mountain pass in the South Tyrol, northern Italy. It connects the Adige valley and the Non Valley. The pass is open year-round. The pass road has a maximum gradient of 9%.

From 1810 until 1815, the pass was on the border of the Italian state founded by Napoleon and the Kingdom of Bavaria to the north.

See also
 List of highest paved roads in Europe
 List of mountain passes

External links 

Mountain passes of the Alps
Mountain passes of South Tyrol
Mountain passes of Trentino
Nonsberg Group